Valtteri Viljanen (born March 3, 1994) is a Finnish professional ice hockey defenceman. He is currently playing with Rögle BK in the Swedish Hockey League (SHL).

Viljanen made his Liiga debut playing with Pori Ässät during the 2014–15 Liiga season.

References

External links

1994 births
Living people
Finnish ice hockey defencemen
Ässät players
Ilves players
Sportspeople from Pori
Rögle BK players
Vaasan Sport players